The Women's Open (originally known as the Women's British Open, and still widely referred to by that name outside the UK) is a major championship in women's professional golf. It is recognised by both the LPGA Tour and the Ladies European Tour as a major. The reigning champion is Ashleigh Buhai, who won in a playoff at Muirfield in 2022.

Since becoming an LPGA major in 2001 it has generally been played in late July or early August. The 2012 edition was scheduled for mid-September, due to the 2012 Summer Olympics in London, while the 2014 event was played in mid-July, the week prior to the Open Championship.

In 2019 it was known as the AIG Women's British Open. From 2007 to 2018, it was called the Ricoh Women's British Open while the previous twenty editions (1987–2006) were sponsored by Weetabix, a breakfast cereal. In July 2020, the sponsorship agreement with AIG was extended through to 2025; as part of the deal the championship was rebranded by The R&A (which has organised the event since 2017) by removing the "British" qualifier, in line with The R&A's men's and senior men's championships, as the AIG Women's Open.

History

The first Women's British Open was played in 1976 when the Ladies' British Open Amateur Stroke Play Championship was extended to include professionals. The Amateur Stroke Play Championship had been organised by the Ladies' Golf Union since 1969. In early 1976 two professionals, Vivien Saunders and Gwen Brandom, and the LGU, agreed that the event would be opened up to professionals, with Saunders and Brandom providing £200 in prize money for the professionals. Eventually total prize money was £500, with five professionals competing in the event. An amateur, Jenny Lee Smith, won the event with Saunders the leading professional, tying for fourth place. Saunders won the event in 1977 on "countback", having tied with Mary Everard but having the better final round, 76 to Everard's 79. Janet Melville won in 1978, with Saunders again the leading professional and taking the first prize of £1,000. Just four professionals competed.

From 1979 the event was separated from the Stroke Play Championship, which returned to being an amateur-only event. Prize money of £10,000, and a first prize of £3,000, attracted a larger number of professionals. At first, it was difficult for the organisers to get the most prestigious courses to agree to host the event, with the exception of Royal Birkdale, which hosted it twice during its early days — in 1982 and 1986. After nearly folding in 1983, the tournament was held at the best of the "second-tier" courses, including Woburn Golf and Country Club for seven straight years, 1990 through 1996, as well as in 1984 and 1999.

As its prestige continued to increase, more of the links courses that are in the rotation for The Open Championship, such as Turnberry (2002) and Royal Lytham & St Annes (1998, 2003, 2006) hosted the tournament, in addition to Royal Birkdale (2000, 2005, 2010).  In 2007, the tournament took place at the Old Course at St Andrews for the first time.

Since 2010, four additional Open Championship venues became first-time hosts for the women's event: Carnoustie (2011), Royal Liverpool (2012), Royal Troon (2020, year where only women had The Open), and Muirfield (2022).  The tournament has yet to be played at two Open Championship courses: Royal St. George's in southeastern England, and Royal Portrush in Northern Ireland.  Currently, Turnberry is unable to be on the Open rota because of political ramifications of its American owner.

Unlike its male counterpart, the Women's Open has not adopted a links-only policy. This greatly increases the number of potential venues, especially the number close to the major population centres of England.  Following the 2017 merger of the Ladies Golf Union with The R&A, the tournament is now organised by the same organisation as the men's tournament.

Through 1993, the tournament was an official stop only on the Ladies European Tour, with the exception of the 1984 edition, which was co-sanctioned by the LPGA Tour.  Starting in 1994, it became a permanent LPGA Tour event, which increased both the quality of the field and the event's prestige. It has been an official LPGA major since 2001, when it replaced the du Maurier Classic in Canada. In 2005, the starting field size was increased to 150, but only the low 65 (plus ties) survive the cut after the second round. In both 2007 and 2008 the prize fund was £1.05 million. Starting in 2009, the prize fund changed from being fixed in pounds to U.S. dollars.

Tied for most victories in the Women's British Open with three each are Karrie Webb of Australia and Sherri Steinhauer of the United States. Both won the tournament twice before it became an LPGA major and once after. Yani Tseng of Taiwan and Jiyai Shin of South Korea are the multiple winners as a major championship. The other multiple winner is Debbie Massey of the U.S., with consecutive wins (1980 and 1981) well before it was an LPGA co-sanctioned event.

Winners

(a) denotes amateur
Source for later tournaments:

Host courses
The Women's Open has been played at the following courses, listed in order of number of times hosted (as of 2022): 
9 Woburn Golf Club (Duke's Course)
6 Royal Birkdale Golf Club
5 Royal Lytham & St Annes Golf Club
4 Sunningdale Golf Club (Old
Course)
2 St Andrews Links (Old Course), Woburn Golf Club (Marquess Course), Turnberry Golf Club (Ailsa Course), Lindrick Golf Club, Carnoustie Golf Links
1 Royal Liverpool Golf Club, Royal Troon Golf Club (Old Course), Kingsbarns Golf Links, Fulford Golf Club, Wentworth Golf Club, Southport & Ainsdale Golf Club, Ferndown Golf Club, St. Mellion, Moor Park Golf Club, Northumberland Golf Club, Foxhills Golf Club, Muirfield

Future venues

Smyth Salver
The Smyth Salver is awarded to the leading amateur, provided that the player completes all 72 holes, for one year. The winner also receives a silver medal. The salver was donated by Moira Smyth, a past president of the Ladies' Golf Union.

 1979 – Sue Hedges
 1980 – Marta Figueras-Dotti & Belle Robertson
 1981 – Belle Robertson
 1982 – Marta Figueras-Dotti
 1983 – No championship
 1984 – Mary McKenna
 1985 – Jill Thornhill
 1986 – Vicki Thomas
 1987 – Joanne Furby
 1988 – Kathryn Imrie
 1989 – Joanne Morley
 1990 – Sarah Bennett
 1991 – Akiko Fukushima
 1992 – None
 1993 – Patricia Meunier & Joanne Morley
 1994 – Tina Fischer
 1995 – Lisa Dermott
 1996 – Barbara Hackett
 1997 – Silvia Cavalleri
 1998 – None
 1999 – Giulia Sergas
 2000 – None
 2001 – Rebecca Hudson
 2002 – None
 2003 – Elisa Serramia
 2004 – Louise Stahle
 2005 – Michelle Wie
 2006 – Amy Yang
 2007 – Melissa Reid
 2008 – Anna Nordqvist
 2009 – None
 2010 – Caroline Hedwall
 2011 – Danielle Kang
 2012 – Lydia Ko
 2013 – Georgia Hall & Lydia Ko
 2014 – Emma Talley
 2015 – Luna Sobrón
 2016 – Leona Maguire
 2017 – Sophie Lamb
 2018 – Atthaya Thitikul
 2019 – Atthaya Thitikul
 2020 – None
 2021 – Louise Duncan
 2022 – Rose Zhang

References

External links
 
 Coverage on the LPGA official site
 Coverage on the Ladies European Tour official site

 
Golf tournaments in the United Kingdom
British Open
British Open
R&A championships
British Open
1976 establishments in the United Kingdom
Recurring sporting events established in 1976